The following list is a discography of production by Noel "Detail" Fisher, an American hip hop record producer and recording artist. It includes a list of songs produced, co-produced and remixed by year, artist, album and title.

Singles produced

2005

Ray J – Raydiation 
 01. "Raydiation (Intro)" 
 06. "Blue High Heels" (produced with Ray J)
 07. "Melody" 
 09. "Quit Actin" (featuring R. Kelly & Shorty Mack)
 10. "Exotic" 
 12. "Sexy" (featuring Mýa)
 13. "In The Mood" 
 14. "Anytime"
 15. "Centerview" (produced with Ray J)

Various artists – Roll Bounce (soundtrack) 
 05. "Quit Actin'" (R. Kelly & Ray J feat. Shorty Mack)

2007

Bone Thugs-N-Harmony – T.H.U.G.S. 
 01. T.H.U.G.S.
 03. "Nation Of Thugs" 
 04. "Wildin'" 
 08. "Sweet Jane" 
 10. "Don't Waste My Time" 
 11. "Young Thugs" 
 13. "So Many Places"

Mýa – Liberation 
 05. "No Touchin'"

2008

Ray J – All I Feel 
 03. "Sexy Can I" (featuring Yung Berg)
 04. "Gifts" 
 09. "It's Up To You"

Yung Berg – Look What You Made Me 
 03. "Sexy Can I" (with Ray J)

Marvin Winans Jr – Image of a Man 
 08. "U Know Love"

Akon – Freedom 
 06. "I'm So Paid" (featuring Lil' Wayne & Young Jeezy) (Produced with Akon)
 11. "Birthmark" (Produced with Akon & Giorgio Tuinfort)
 13. "Freedom" (Produced with Akon & Giorgio Tuinfort)
 14. "I'm So Paid (Remix)" (featuring Lil' Wayne) (iTunes Bonus Track)

2009

Hussein Fatal – Thugtertainment Soldiers 
 06. "Something Bout This Money"

Ray J – For the Love of Ray J 
 12. "Sexy Can I (Remix)" (featuring Sheek Louch)

Tha Realest – Witness Tha Realest 
 14. "Get It N"

Sean Kingston – Tomorrow 
 11. "Shoulda Let U Go" (featuring Good Charlotte) (produced with DJ Frank E & Drum Up)

Down AKA Kilo – Cholo Skate 
 03. "Certified Boss" (featuring DJ Quik & Detail)
 09. "Her 2 Step" (featuring Detail)

2010

O'Mega Red – The Redtape Vol.3
04. "She Luvs It" (featuring Detail)
09. "Endz" (featuring Detail)

Lil Jon – Crunk Rock 
11. "Get In Get Out" (produced with Lil Jon & Catalyst)

Travie McCoy – Lazarus 
11. "Ms. Tattoo Girl" (featuring T-Pain) (Deluxe Edition bonus track)

Good Charlotte – Cardiology
13. "There She Goes"

2011

New Boyz – Too Cool to Care 
 06. "Magazine Girl" (produced with H-Money)

Lil Wayne – Tha Carter IV 
 12. "How to Love" (produced with Drum Up)
Leftover
 "I Hate Love"

Romeo Santos – Formula, Vol. 1 
 14. "All Aboard" (featuring Lil Wayne) (produced with RedOne and Taio Cruz)

T-Pain – RevolveR 
 02. "Bottlez" (featuring Detail)

Bow Wow 
 00. "Sweat" (featuring Lil Wayne) (produced with Bei Maejor)

2012

Kelly Rowland
00. "Ice" (featuring Lil Wayne)

DJ Khaled – Kiss the Ring
09. "I Don't See 'Em" (featuring Birdman, Ace Hood & 2 Chainz)

Gucci Mane – Trap God
20. "Get Lost" (featuring Birdman)

Nelly – Scorpio Season
04. "Girl Drop That" (featuring Detail)
10. "Type of Shit I Be On"

2013

Tyga – Hotel California
08. "Show You" (featuring Future)

Lil Wayne – I Am Not a Human Being II 
02. "Curtains" (featuring Boo)
05. "No Worries" (featuring Detail)
12. "Romance"

Rich Gang – Rich Gang
02. "Million Dollar" (featuring Detail & Future)
03. "Tapout" (featuring Lil Wayne, Birdman, Mack Maine, Nicki Minaj & Future)
07. "Bigger Than Life" (featuring Chris Brown, Tyga, Birdman & Lil Wayne)
08. "100 Favors" (featuring Detail, Birdman & Kendrick Lamar)
10. "Burn the House" (featuring Detail)
13. "Sunshine" (featuring Limp Bizkit, Flo Rida, Birdman & Caskey)

Drake – Nothing Was the Same
05. "Own It"  
11. "305 to My City" (featuring Detail)
13. "Paris Morton Music 2"

Nelly – M.O. 
02. "Give U Dat" (featuring Future)
04. "Heaven" (featuring Daley)
06. "100K" (featuring 2 Chainz)

B.o.B – Underground Luxury
04. "Ready" (featuring Future)

Beyoncé – Beyoncé 
03. "Drunk in Love" (featuring Jay-Z)
07. "Jealous"

2014

Mario
 "Dodge the Bullet"

Future
 "I Be U"
 "Good Morning"

Ashanti – Braveheart
04. "Count"

Various artists –  Young Money: Rise of an Empire
08. "Lookin Ass" (performed by Nicki Minaj)

Soulja Boy – Super Dope
09. "Fuck That Flo" (featuring Busta Rhymes)

Jennifer Lopez – A.K.A.
04. "I Luh Ya Papi" (featuring French Montana)
09. "Worry No More" (featuring Rick Ross)

Wiz Khalifa – Blacc Hollywood
02. "We Dem Boyz"

Tinashe – Aquarius
08. "Pretend" (featuring ASAP Rocky)

Nicki Minaj – The Pinkprint
20. "Mona Lisa"
21. "Put You in a Room"
20. "Wamables"

2015

Mila J – The Waiting Game
French Montana – Casino Life 2: Brown Bag Legend
 05. "Yay Yay"

Ray J and Lil Wayne – "Brown Sugar"

Sanaa Lathan Featuring Dej Loaf – "Emotional"

Big Sean Feat Detail and Pharrell  – "What A Year"

2016

Twenty88 – Twenty88
05. "2 Minute Warning" (featuring Detail and K-Ci & JoJo)

2017

Big Sean – I Decided.
 12. "Inspire Me"

Future – HNDRXX
 02. "Comin Out Strong" (featuring The Weeknd)
 04. "Damage"
 05. "Use Me"
 08. "Fresh Air"
 09. "Neva Missa Lost"
 15. "Selfish" (featuring Rihanna)

Nicki Minaj & Lil Wayne
"Changed It"

French Montana – Jungle Rules
 10. "No Pressure" (featuring Future)

Miguel – War & Leisure
 02. "Pineapple Skies"

References

External links
 
 

Production discographies
Hip hop discographies
 
Discographies of American artists